This list of tallest buildings in Indianapolis ranks skyscrapers and high-rises in the U.S. city of Indianapolis, Indiana, by height. Majority of the skyscrapers are located in Downtown Indianapolis. The tallest building in the city is the 49-story Salesforce Tower, which rises  and was completed in 1990. The structure is the tallest completed building in the state and the 83rd tallest building in the U.S. In addition, it is the tallest building in the Midwest outside Chicago, Cleveland, and Minneapolis. The city's second tallest structure is the OneAmerica Tower, which was the tallest building in Indiana from 1982 until 1990. Of the 40 tallest buildings in Indiana, 34 are located in Indianapolis.

The history of skyscrapers in Indianapolis began with the completion in 1895 of the Thomas Building, which is regarded as the first high-rise in the city. Indianapolis went through an early high-rise construction boom in the 1960s, during which time the city saw the completion of the  City-County Building. The City-County Building was the first building in the city to rise higher than the Soldiers' and Sailors' Monument, and was the tallest building in the city until 1970. However, the pace of new high-rise construction then slowed until 1982; starting in that year, Indianapolis entered into a large building boom that lasted until 1990. During that time, six of the city's ten tallest skyscrapers were built, including the Chase Tower, OneAmerica Tower and Market Tower. As of May 2014, there are 142 completed high-rises in the city. Indianapolis ranks first in the state in high-rise count, ahead of Fort Wayne.

Indianapolis was the site of very little high-rise construction from the end of the boom in 1990 until the mid-2000s; the city has since entered into a third period of high-rise construction, with four skyscrapers that rank in city's 20 tallest buildings being completed after 2000. The tallest of these is the  JW Marriott Indianapolis, standing at 34 stories tall. Other projects completed after 2000 are the  Conrad Indianapolis and  Simon Property Group Headquarters, both in 2006. One Indiana Square, now known as Regions Tower, went through an exterior refinishing after being damaged by high winds on April 2, 2006. As of February 2019, there are four high-rise buildings under construction, approved for construction or proposed for construction in Indianapolis.



Tallest buildings
This includes spires and architectural details but does not include antenna masts. The "Year" column indicates the year in which a building was completed.

Other structures
The "Year" column indicates the year in which a structure was completed.

Tallest under construction, approved, and proposed
This lists high-rises that are under construction, approved, or proposed in Indianapolis and planned to rise at least  in height, but are not yet completed structures.

Timeline of tallest buildings
This lists buildings that once held the title of tallest building in Indianapolis. The Indiana State Soldiers' and Sailors' Monument is often billed as the tallest building in Indianapolis from its completion in 1902 until the completion of the City-County Building. Because it is classified as an uninhabitable building, it is omitted from this list.

See also
 Indiana Tower
 List of tallest buildings in Indiana
 List of tallest air traffic control towers in the United States

Notes
Indianapolis, Kansas City, Portland, St. Louis and Hartford are tied with three each. Source of Skyline ranking information: SkyscraperPage.com: New York, Chicago, Miami, Houston, Los Angeles, Dallas, Atlanta, San Francisco, Las Vegas, Boston, Seattle, Philadelphia, Pittsburgh, Jersey City, Minneapolis, Denver, Detroit, Charlotte, Columbus, Tulsa, Cleveland, New Orleans, Tampa, Indianapolis, Kansas City, Portland, St. Louis, Hartford.
B. This building was demolished in 1962 following the completion of the City-County Building.
C. This building was constructed as One Indiana Square but has since been renamed Regions Tower.
D. This building was constructed as the AUL Building but has since been renamed OneAmerica Tower.
E. This building was constructed as the Bank One Tower but has since been renamed Salesforce Tower.

References
General
 
Specific

External links
 Diagram of Indianapolis skyscrapers on SkyscraperPage

.

 
Indianapolis
Tallest in Indianapolis